Bayshady (Bayşaźı) is a rural locality (a village) in Teplyakovsky Selsoviet, Burayevsky District, Bashkortostan, Russia. The population was 135 as of 2010. There are 2 streets.

Geography 
Bayshady is located 35 km north of Burayevo (the district's administrative centre) by road. Sarsaz is the nearest rural locality.

References 

Rural localities in Burayevsky District